Reader Wright Clarke (May 18, 1812 – May 23, 1872) was a U.S. Representative from Ohio for two terms from 1865 to 1869.

Biography
Born in Bethel, Ohio, Clarke was the son of Houten Clarke (1766-1835) and Nancy (Riley) Clarke (1786-1857). Clarke learned the art of printing as well as studying law.
He was admitted to the bar in 1836 and commenced practice in Batavia, Ohio.

Clarke published a Whig paper in Shawneetown, Illinoisbefore returning to Batavia, Ohio. He also served as member of the State House of Representatives 1840–1842 along with being a Presidential elector in 1844 for Whigs Clay/Frelinghuysen.He also served as clerk of the court of Clermont County 1846–1852.

Clarke was elected as a Republican to the Thirty-ninth and Fortieth Congresses (March 4, 1865 – March 3, 1869). He also become the third auditor of the Treasury from March 26, 1869 to March 26, 1870. Eventually, he was appointed collector of internal revenue in Ohio.

Death 
He died in Batavia, Ohio, May 23, 1872 where he was interred in the Union Cemetery.

Sources

1812 births
1872 deaths
People from Bethel, Ohio
Ohio Whigs
19th-century American newspaper editors
Members of the Ohio House of Representatives
1844 United States presidential electors
American male journalists
19th-century American male writers
19th-century American politicians
Journalists from Ohio
People from Shawneetown, Illinois
People from Batavia, Ohio
Republican Party members of the United States House of Representatives from Ohio